Bayane Al Yaoume is a daily Arabic language Moroccan newspaper.

History and profile
Bayane Al Yaoume was established in 1971. It is the sister publication of Al Bayane. The publisher of papers is Bayane SA.

The 2003 circulation of Bayane Al Yaoume was 15,000 copies. The paper is the organ of the Party of Progress and Socialism.

References

External links
 Official website

1971 establishments in Morocco
Arabic-language newspapers
Mass media in Casablanca
B
Newspapers established in 1971
Socialist newspapers